El Alia Cemetery is a cemetery in a suburb of Algiers in the commune of Oued Smar in Algeria. The name "El Alia" means in Arabic which is high, but came from the surname of the donor of the land in 1928, Hamza El-Alia.

History 
It comprises tombs of numerous Algerian notables and also has the graves of actors and actresses and other artists (opera singers, musicians, painters, sculptors, architects, writers, poets). It also includes the tombs of several scientists, academicians and sports people.

Allied soldiers who died during the North African Campaign were also buried there, including men who were evacuated to Africa after being wounded during Operation Husky, and who died there. Commonwealth graves are maintained by the Commonwealth War Graves Commission.

Notable interments
 Emir Abdelkader, military, political and religious leader, freedom fighter, writer, human rights advocate (body controversially reinterned from 1883 burial grounds in Damascus near his mentor Ibn Arabi's body in 1965)
 Ahmed Mahsas, politician
 Kateb Yacine, writer
 Colonel Amirouche, revolutionary fighter
 Lalla Fatma N'Soumer, important figure of the Algerian resistance movement
 Krim Belkacem, revolutionary fighter and politician
 Ferhat Abbas, political leader
 Warda Al-Jazairia, singer
 Larbi Ben M'hidi, leader
 Mohamed Benameur, football player
 Ali Kafi, politician
 Smain Lamari, head of an Algerian intelligence service, the Department of Counter-Espionage and Internal Security
 M'hamed Benguettaf, actor and playwright
 Abderrezak Bouhara, politician
 Ahmed Ben Bella, socialist soldier, revolutionary and first President of Algeria
 Chadli Bendjedid, politician and third President of Algeria
 Houari Boumedienne colonel, military and politician, and second President of Algeria
 Djelloul Khatib, revolutionary fighter and public servant
 Ahmed Mahsas, politician
 Mahfoud Nahnah, politician
 Mostefa Beloucif, military
 Ali Tounsi,  Chief of Algeria's national police force
 Abdelmadjid Aouchiche, founder of DNC/ANP and ex minister of the habitat
 Mohamed Hardi, politician
 Bachir Boumaza, politician
 Cherif Guellal, businessman and diplomat
 Lakehal Ayat, military general and politician
 Chérif Belkacem, politician
 Gaston Désiré Chatelain, military adjudant-chef buried in 1958 he was exhumed in 1959 and buried in Thugny-Trugny, France.
 Abdelaziz Bouteflika, politician and seventh President of Algeria.
 Abdelkader Bensalah, politician, President of the Council of the Nation and acting Head of State of Algeria.

See also
 Cemeteries of Algiers

References

External links
 
 El Alia Cemetery at Find a Grave
 El Alia Cemetery at billiongraves.com

1928 establishments in Algeria
Cemeteries in Algeria
Commonwealth War Graves Commission cemeteries in Algeria
Buildings and structures in Algiers